Proof of Love may refer to:

 Proof of Love, 2008 album by Old Man Luedecke
 "Proof of Love", song by Paul Simon from Stranger to Stranger
 "Proof of Love", season 2 episode of R.I.S, police scientifique
 "Proof of Love", English title of "Aishō" or "Aishou", B-side of the single "But/Aishō" from Koda Kumi
 "Prueba de Amor" (English: "Proof of Love"), a song by Mexican band El Tri from No Podemos Volar
 "Proof of Love", a "one-woman" stage play written by Chisa Hutchinson.